Brigadier General Clarence Theodore Edwinson (July 1, 1912 – June 10, 1985) was an American fighter pilot and flying ace of World War II, a collegiate football star and a world champion skeet shooter. He is alternatively referred to as C.T. Edwinson in many sources as he disliked the name "Clarence."  His superiors and peers referred to him as "Curly" and he was also known to his subordinates as "Big Ed."

Early life
Edwinson was born on July 1, 1912 and attended school in Topeka, Kansas, graduating from Topeka High School in 1929. He next attended Washburn College where he was a member of the Kansas Beta Chapter of Phi Delta Theta.

Athletic prowess
Throughout his life Edwinson was an accomplished athlete.  At Washburn University he was a four-year letterman in football and in 1932 was named to the All Central Conference team as running back and was an honorable mention for the AP All American team.  He also lettered in basketball in 1929.  "The 1933 Washburn yearbook described him as 'probably the greatest halfback ever to play for Washburn.'"  Washburn coach Ernest Bearg said that Edwinson is "one of the best back in the United States.  He is exceptional as a ball carrier, blocker, passer and defensive safety or halfback.  In my 17 years of coaching I have had only two backs that could compare with those were Red Grange of Illinois and Glen Presnell of Nebraska."

As an Air Force colonel in 1952, Edwinson won a gold medal in skeet shooting at the ISSF World Shooting Championships in Oslo, Norway scoring a perfect 150/150.

In 1970, Washburn inducted him into its Athletics Hall of Fame.Topeka High School inducted the general into its hall of fame in 1988–89 labeling him "a colorful figure on the gridiron and in the air."

Early military career
Enlisting as a flying cadet in February 1934, Edwinson took his flying training and continued as a flying cadet until February 29, 1936, when he was commissioned a second lieutenant in the Reserve, and assigned to Barksdale Field, Louisiana.  From July 1937 to December 1940 he served as an instructor and flight commander at Randolph Field, Texas and then went to Pursuit School at Craig Field, Alabama.

Going to England as a military observer with the Fighter Command of the Royal Air Force during the Battle of Britain, Edwinson returned to the United States in March 1942, to become group operations officer at Dale Mabry Field, Florida. In December of that year he enrolled as a student at the Command and General Staff School, Fort Leavenworth, Kansas, and graduated the following February.

World War II
Immediately thereafter, Edwinson assumed command of a fighter wing at Drew Army Air Field, Florida, and in May 1943, went to Alaska as executive officer of the Eleventh Air Force.  That October he was appointed wing executive officer to the San Francisco Fighter Wing in California, and in April 1944 assumed command of the 412th Base Unit at Seattle, Washington, moving the unit to Portland, Oregon. 

Moving to Italy in August 1944, General Edwinson was designated commander of the 82nd Fighter Group.  According to one source, Edwinson led the first all-fighter shuttle mission to Russia.  Air Force records, however, show this first shuttle mission did not occur until July 22, 1944.

Edwinson was in command during a controversial incident in November 1944 when American pilots shot down four Soviet Yaks.

The incident is described in Combat Aircraft of World War II by Glenn B. Bavousett:

Lee K. Carr in  "Air Classics" (Volume 38, Number 8) has a different take on the incident blaming Edwinson for poor planning and communication though this seems to be a minority opinion.  Indeed, the fact that Edwinson eventually became a brigadier general and was appointed to command on three subsequent occasions seems to underscore how much Carr's opinion seems to be in the minority.

The following January he went to Bluethenthal Army Air Field, North Carolina, as deputy base commanding officer, and on March 13, 1945, assumed command of the base. On October 21, 1945, he became deputy base commanding officer of Shaw AAF, South Carolina.  By the end of the war he had flown 30 combat missions and 13,000 hours.

Post-war service
The following May, Edwinson assumed command of the 366th Fighter Group at Fritzlar Air Base, Germany, and that November was named commander of Lechfeld Air Base.  In February 1947, he returned to Fritzlar AB as commanding officer of the 27th Fighter Group, and on July 21 of that year assumed command of the 86th Composite Group (1948: 86th Fighter Group) at Bad Kissengen Air Base, Germany. At that time the 86th was the only combat-capable fighter group of the USAF in Europe.  General Curtis LeMay regarded Edwinson as his best combat commander during this period.  LeMay planned to use Edwinson's P-47's if he needed to take offensive actions to keep Berlin supplied.  On July 1, 1948, the group became part of the newly activated 86th Fighter Wing, and Edwinson moved up to command the wing.

Returning to the United States in June 1949, Edwinson became base and wing commanding officer of the 3902nd Air Base Wing, Strategic Air Command, at Offutt Air Force Base, Nebraska.  On April 6, 1951, he assumed command of the 42d Air Division, SAC, at Bergstrom Air Force Base, Texas.  The general became special assistant to the commander, Second Air Force, SAC, at Bergstrom AFB, on June 30, 1957.  He was promoted to brigadier general on December 15, 1953.

Joining the Air Defense Command, on August 15, 1957, Edwinson was assigned duty as commander of the 30th Air Division (Defense), Eastern Air Defense Force, with station at Willow Run Air Force Station, Michigan, with additional duty on August 17 as commander, 30th Continental Air Defense Division.

On June 10, 1958, he was relieved from additional duty as commander, 30th CONAD Division and assigned additional duty as commander, 30th NORAD (CONAD) Division, Belleville, Mich.  His last duty assignment was as commander of the Air Force's Squadron Officer School.  He retired from active duty in 1961 to Austin, Texas.  The general is buried in the Fort Sam Houston National Cemetery.

Edwinson's decorations include the Distinguished Flying Cross, Air Medal with three oak leaf clusters and the French Croix de Guerre with Palm.  He was rated a command pilot.

References

United States Army Command and General Staff College alumni
1912 births
1985 deaths
Washburn University alumni
American World War II flying aces
Burials at Fort Sam Houston National Cemetery
Recipients of the Air Medal
Recipients of the Distinguished Flying Cross (United States)
Recipients of the Croix de Guerre 1939–1945 (France)
People from Valley Falls, Kansas
Military personnel from Kansas
Aviators from Kansas